Karin Schäfer (born 1963) is a performance artist and the head of the Karin Schäfer Figuren Theater - Visual Theatre Productions company. After studying puppetry arts with Harry V. Tozer at Barcelona's Instituto del Teatro and working in Spain for several years, she returned to Austria in 1993.

Based on classical puppetry techniques, she developed an artform she calls "Visual Theatre", integrating visual arts, fine arts, music, dance and new media rather than classical puppetry. She cooperates with artists from many genres, focusing on visual impact and abstaining from words in order to appeal to her audience from different countries, cultures and ages.

Life and work
Karin Schäfer grew up in Vienna and Neusiedl am See. She went to Spain in 1987 to study puppetry arts with Harry V. Tozer at the Instituto del Teatro, Barcelona.

 1989 founded puppet theatre Per Poc together with Santi Arnal. The first self-designed production was "Piccolo Forte Pianissimo". They toured Spain, France, Germany and Belgium until 1993.
 1991-1993, she also collaborated with Spanish puppeteer Jordi Bertran creating "Poemas Visuales" in 1992 and toured France and Spain.
 1993, at Vienna, she created and directed the expressionist dance performance "Über das Marionettentheater" (On Marionette Theatre) after an essay by Heinrich von Kleist which had a run of 6 weeks in Vienna and was subsequently invited to renowned international festivals in Austria, Germany, France, Greece, Italy, the former Yugoslavia and Czechoslovakia, and to the International Festival of Experimental Theatre in Cairo.
 1993-1994, collaborating with Schneck + Co Theatre for Children, she designed and built the marionettes for "Post für den Tiger", toured Austria and presented the show on ORF.
 1994, "Poemas Visuales" earned the jury prize at the Cannes International Theater Festival.
 1997, she premiered "Stringtime" at dietheater [sic], Konzerthaus, Vienna which was presented until 2007 at international festivals all over the world (Austria, Belarus, Czech Republic, Germany, Spain, France, Hungary, Italy, Montenegro, Netherlands, Portugal, Poland, Russia, Turkey, South Korea, Cuba, Pakistan and Mexico). Also in 1997, she co-produced with Kabinetttheater "Wir drei die zwei einzigen" on a text by Max Gad which premiered at the Vienna Künstlerhaus.
 1998, she co-produced Peter and the Wolf with Barcelona's Per Poc theatre.
 2000, her new show for adults "Twice upon a time" opened the Kleist-Festspiele at Frankfurt (Oder) It has been invited to international festivals in fifteen countries on four continents.
 2001, she presented "Peter and the Wolf" at the Konzerthaus, Vienna together with Per Poc (Barcelona) and the Wiener Kammerphilharmonie (Vienna Chamber Orchestra), directed by Claudius Traunfellner.
 2002, she premiered "home@anywhere", a show for adolescents about the live of young people in Pakistan, based on her experiences and interviews made in two journeys to Lahore, Pakistan, and the Thar Desert at the border between Pakistan and India.
 2002, she premiered "Rose Dorn" after Tchaikovskys Sleeping Beauty, together with pianist Ingrid Marsoner in Konzerthaus, Vienna, followed by invitations to the Istanbul Puppet Festival and to Santa Maria Island.
 2003, she conceived "PannOpticum", a biannual International Festival of Visual Theatre in Neusiedl am See, and since is its artistic director.
 2004, she produced "Da ist der Wurm drin" based on the famous painting Children's Games by Pieter Bruegel the Elder.
 2005, in co-production with Cordula Nossek / Dachtheater she showed "Skywalker", about a fictive meeting of the first two women in space (Valentina Tereshkova and Sally Ride; in reality, their excursions were twenty years apart.), at Dschungel Wien, Vienna's theatre for young audience in Museumsquartier. Same year premiered Pictures at an Exhibition, an homage to the works of famous artists of the 20th century, with original music by Modest Mussorgsky together with Austrian pianist Christopher Hinterhuber, at Konzerthaus, Vienna, and subsequently performed in European concert halls and museums such as the Salzburg Museum of Modern Art and the Philharmonie Luxembourg.
 2006, a co-production for the ISAF World Sailing Games on lake Neusiedl; "Wind und weiter" (en:Wind and Beyond), a nonverbal multimedia theatre performance for the multinational visitors. This show will be staged in a completely new version together with experimental musicians from the institute for transacoustic research in Vienna and receive its premiere at the Vienna Concert Hall - Konzerthaus Wien - in October 2008.

Gallery

Awards
Karin Schäfer has performed in 28 countries on four continents, by chronological order: Spain, France, Belgium, Italy, Ireland, Andorra, Hungary, Germany, the Netherlands, Portugal, Greece, Czech Republic, Switzerland, Slovakia, Poland, Yugoslavia/Montenegro, Turkey, Russia, Belarus, Egypt, Korea, Pakistan, Kenia, Mexico, Cuba, Luxembourg, Austria.

She won first prize at the First International Festival of Solo Puppeteers at Łódź, Poland in 1999  and was awarded Best Performer of same festival in 2003. Together with Santi Arnal and Jordi Bertran she won the prize of the jury of Cannes International Actors’ Performance Festival in 1994. In 2003, Stringtime was awarded "Best Foreign Performance of the Year" at the Festival International de Teatro de La Habana in La Havana, Cuba.

References

External links

1963 births
Living people
20th-century Austrian women artists
21st-century Austrian women artists
Austrian performance artists
Austrian puppeteers
People from Mödling
Women performance artists